Yee Mon (also known as Maung Tin Thit or Tin Thit; born 9 August 1967) is a Burmese poet, former political prisoner, and politician currently serving as Minister of Defense of National Unity Government of Myanmar.

Maung Tin Thit was in medical school during the pro-democracy uprising of 1988 against the military junta that ruled Burma. Tin Thit participated in the protests, and was imprisoned by the regime for seven years. Maung Tin Thit later worked as an environmental activist.

In the 2015 general election, Tin Thit successfully ran as a candidate for Parliament with the National League for Democracy in a district in the national capital of Naypyidaw.  Tin Thit received 27,321 votes, narrowly defeating U Wai Lwin, a powerful former military general who had been defense minister until a few months before the elections. Tin Thit's victory was viewed as a surprise because the district has more than 7,000 soldiers and 2,000 police officers, who were seen as likely to favor an ex-general.

Notes

Living people
1967 births
Burmese democracy activists
Burmese male poets
National League for Democracy politicians
Burmese prisoners and detainees